Cyclothyris is an extinct genus of brachiopods from the Cretaceous of Africa, Asia, Europe, and North America.

Species 
Species within this genus include:
†Cyclothyris acuticostalis
†Cyclothyris africana
†Cyclothyris aliformis
†Cyclothyris alikentica
†Cyclothyris americana
†Cyclothyris astieriana
†Cyclothyris burgemakensis
†Cyclothyris compressa
†Cyclothyris dagestanica
†Cyclothyris densleonis
†Cyclothyris difformis
†Cyclothyris compressa
†Cyclothyris elegans 
†Cyclothyris formosa
†Cyclothyris gibbsiana
†Cyclothyris globata
†Cyclothyris juigneti
†Cyclothyris kennedyi
†Cyclothyris lamarckiana
†Cyclothyris larwoodi
†Cyclothyris latissima
†Cyclothyris punfieldensis
†Cyclothyris subtrigonalis
†Cyclothyris sutchanensis
†Cyclothyris tenuicostata
†Cyclothyris ulaganica
†Cyclothyris vespertilio
†Cyclothyris zudakharica

Sources 

 Fossils (Smithsonian Handbooks) by David Ward (Page 84)

External links
Cyclothyris in the Paleobiology Database

Rhynchonellida
Prehistoric brachiopod genera
Cretaceous brachiopods
Cretaceous brachiopods of Africa
Cretaceous brachiopods of Asia
Cretaceous brachiopods of Europe
Cretaceous brachiopods of North America